Hải Ninh is a rural commune of Bắc Bình District, Bình Thuận Province in South Central Coast Vietnam.

References 

Populated places in Bình Thuận province